Kailajärvi is a Finnish surname that may refer to
Jaakko Kailajärvi (born 1941), Finnish weightlifter
Jouni Kailajärvi (born 1938–2003), Finnish weightlifter, brother of Jaakko
Hannu Kailajärvi, Finnish businessman responsible for the WinCapita Internet-based Ponzi scheme

Finnish-language surnames